Laura Roesler (born December 19, 1991) is an American middle distance runner who specializes in the 800 metres. She is currently coached by Rose Monday and based in Florida.

High School career
Roesler was a 22-time North Dakota state champion for Fargo South High School. She ran 2:06.82 as a semi-finalist to place 12th in the 800 metres at the 2008 United States Olympic Trials. Roesler placed 2nd in 2:07.41 behind Chanelle Price at the 2009 U20 USA Track and Field Championships. Roesler placed 2nd in 2:05.80 behind Ajee Wilson at the 2010 U20 USA Track and Field Championships. She earned a 9th place finish in the semi-finals at the 2010 World Junior Championships in Athletics in 2:04.34.

College career
For college, Roesler chose to compete for the Oregon Ducks where she was a Five-Time NCAA Champion, 17-Time All-American, Three-Time Pac-12 Champion. She ran 2:03.85 to win the 800 meters at the 2014 NCAA Division I Indoor Track and Field Championships. She ran 2:01.22 to win the 800 meters at the 2014 NCAA Division I Outdoor Track and Field Championships. For her accomplishments in 2014, she won The Bowerman award.

International career
Roesler ran 1:59.04 and was runner up in the 800 metres at the 2014 USA Outdoor Track and Field Championships. She was again runner up in the 800 metres at the 2016 USA Indoor Track and Field Championships and ran 2:00.80 to place 4th in the 2016 IAAF World Indoor Championships. Roesler ran 2:03.55 and was 21st place in the 800 metres at the 2016 United States Olympic Trials. Roesler ran 2:01.10 to place 7th at 2017 USA Outdoor Track and Field Championships. Roesler ran 2:00.84 to place 9th at 2018 USA Outdoor Track and Field Championships.

References

External links

Laura Roesler all-athletics profile

1991 births
American female middle-distance runners
Living people
Oregon Ducks women's track and field athletes
Sportspeople from Fargo, North Dakota
World Athletics Championships athletes for the United States
Track and field athletes from North Dakota